Bright Idea is the debut studio album of American power pop band Orson. Originally self-released in 2005, it was released commercially on May 29, 2006 in the UK and internationally on June 13, 2006.

The album was recorded for just $5,000 in Hollywood, funded by the band themselves, and produced by Noah Shain. It contains the hit singles "No Tomorrow", "Bright Idea", "Happiness" and "Already Over". Bright Idea charted at number one on the official UK Albums Chart on June 4, 2006. The video for the single "Bright Idea" was directed by Tony Petrossian and was released as the follow-up to the UK number-one single "No Tomorrow".

The album was prized with a platinum record in the United Kingdom. About 700,000 copies were sold worldwide.

Founding guitarist Chad Rachild departed the band a year after the completion of the album. He was replaced by Kevin Roentgen.

Track listing
All lyrics written by Jason Pebworth, except where noted; all music written by George Astasio, Chris Cano, Johnny Lonely, Pebworth, and Chad Rachild. None of the tracks were written by Kevin Roentgen whose name appears sometimes as writer. Album was written a year prior to him even joining band.

 "Bright Idea" – 4:13
 "No Tomorrow" – 2:47
 "Happiness" – 3:56
 "Already Over" – 3:52
 "Downtown" – 4:23*
 "Tryin to Help" – 3:04
 "So Ahead of Me" – 3:34
 "Last Night" – 4:33
 "Look Around" – 5:05
 "Save the World" – 3:40
 "The Okay Song" – 3:50

UK edition only.

Personnel
 George Astasio - guitars
 Chris Cano - drums
 Johnny Lonely - bass
 Jason Pebworth - vocals
 Chad Rachild - guitars (tracks 1-4 and 6-11)
 Kevin Roentgen - guitars (track 5)

Release history

Charts

Weekly charts

Year-end charts

References

Orson (band) albums
2006 debut albums
Mercury Records albums